The Hiwassee/Ocoee Scenic River State Park is a Tennessee state park in Polk County, Tennessee, United States, that provides access to the Hiwassee and Ocoee rivers.

A  stretch of the Hiwassee River, extending from the North Carolina state line to U.S. Route 411, was the first river to be designated by the State Scenic River Program. The main portion of the park is Hiwassee State Scenic River Park.

Amenities
The Hiwassee State Scenic River park has a campground, Gee Creek Campground, has 47 sites plus 8 separate group campsites. Hiking and Fishing can also be done at the park.

References

Hiwassee/Ocoee Scenic River State Park

External links
Hiwassee/Ocoee Scenic River State Park
USDA Forest Service Southern Region Ocoee Whitewater Center

State parks of Tennessee
State parks of the Appalachians
Protected areas of Polk County, Tennessee